Robert Donald Cess (March 3, 1933 – March 22, 2022) was a professor of atmospheric sciences at Stony Brook University. He was born in Portland, Oregon. Cess earned his bachelor of science degree in mechanical engineering from Oregon State University and his master's degree from Purdue University in Indiana in 1956. He received a Ph.D. from the University of Pittsburgh in 1959. He is a recognized leader in the fields of climate change and atmospheric radiation transfer. His research interests involve modeling of climate feedbacks that can either amplify or diminish global climate change, and interpreting surface and satellite remote sensing data.

He has been a part of studies which have found problems with the ability of model the transmission of shortwave radiation through a cloud-free atmosphere, and designed an experiment to test the accuracy of the models. They reported that they found agreement between the models and the observations of clear-sky shortwave radiation at the surface for the period studied, 1985 to 1988. Cess was a lead author of the Intergovernmental Panel on Climate Change and worked with the National Science Foundation on understanding greenhouse warming and its associated policy implications. He died on March 22, 2022, at his home in Connecticut.

Awards
Cess has won numerous awards, including NASA's highest scientific honor—the NASA Exceptional Scientific Achievement Medal in 1989. In 2006, he received the Jule G. Charney Award, which is awarded to scientists in recognition of significant research in the atmospheric or hydrologic sciences, from the American Meteorological Society "for his outstanding contributions to our understanding of the science of atmospheric radiation and climate change and the role of clouds in climate models."

Selected publications

References

1933 births
2022 deaths
American atmospheric scientists
Oregon State University alumni
Purdue University College of Engineering alumni
University of Pittsburgh alumni
Stony Brook University faculty